is a passenger railway station in the city of Matsudo, Chiba, Japan, operated by East Japan Railway Company (JR East).

Lines
Shin-Yahashira Station is served by the Musashino Line between Fuchūhommachi and Nishi-Funabashi, with some trains continuing to Tokyo via the Keiyō Line.  It is located 61.6 kilometers from Fuchūhommachi Station.

Station layout

The station consists of two opposed underground side platforms serving two tracks. The station is staffed.

Platforms

History
Shin-Yahashira Station opened on 2 October 1978.

Passenger statistics
In fiscal 2019, the station was used by an average of 24,705 passengers daily (boarding passengers only).

Surrounding area
 Yabashira Station (Shin-Keisei Line)
 Matsudo Museum
 Yahashira Cemetery
 Forest and Park for the 21st Century　(ja)

See also
 List of railway stations in Japan

References

External links

 JR East station information 

Railway stations in Japan opened in 1978
Stations of East Japan Railway Company
Railway stations in Chiba Prefecture
Musashino Line
Matsudo